is a male Japanese racewalker. He competed in the 50 kilometres walk event at the 2015 World Championships in Athletics in Beijing, China.
 
He finished third in the 50-kilometre race walk event at the 2016 Rio Olympics, but was subsequently disqualified for making contact with Evan Dunfee of Canada, who then moved up from fourth place to claim the bronze medal. He had it given back to him after a few minutes when a Japanese appeal overturned the disqualification.

See also
Japan at the 2015 World Championships in Athletics

References

Living people
1988 births
Sportspeople from Nagano Prefecture
Japanese male racewalkers
Olympic male racewalkers
Olympic athletes of Japan
Olympic bronze medalists for Japan
Olympic bronze medalists in athletics (track and field)
Athletes (track and field) at the 2016 Summer Olympics
Medalists at the 2016 Summer Olympics
World Athletics Championships athletes for Japan
World Athletics Championships medalists
World Athletics Race Walking Team Championships winners
Japan Championships in Athletics winners
Japan Ground Self-Defense Force personnel
21st-century Japanese people